Revolt is the second studio album by Faroese alternative rock band The Dreams, released on February 22, 2010. Published by Black Pelican and recorded in the Chief Management Studio, it was produced by Chief 1 (Lars Pedersen). The album comprises ten songs all written in English, because they want to reach not only Denmark, also other countries. Three singles were released from this album: "Under the Sun", "Revolt" and "The Optimist".

Track listing

Singles

Personnel
 Hans Edward Andreasen – lead vocals, guitar
 Heini Gilstón Corfitz Andersen – lead guitar, backing vocals
 Eirikur Gilstón Corfitz Andersen – bass, backing vocals
 Heini Mortensen - drums, percussion

2010 albums
The Dreams albums